The following is a list of the teams that currently compete or used to compete in the NTT IndyCar Series.

Current full-time teams

Current part-time teams

List of defunct IndyCar teams (1996–present)

Key:

See also 
 List of Champ Car teams
 NASCAR
 Formula One

Teams
Teams
Indycar